Keuw (Keu, Kehu) is an unclassified language of New Guinea.

Keuw is spoken in a swampy lowland region along the Poronai River in Keuw village (kampung) of Wapoga District, Nabire Regency, Papua province, Indonesia. According to oral folklore, the Keuw were originally from Woisaru, and then moved to Sanawado, which may be locations in Wapoga District.

Classification
Mark Donohue (2007) said that Kehu is "probably a Geelvink Bay language, but no one knows enough about those languages, systematically, to say this with confidence for [any of them] beyond Barapasi, T(ar)unggare and Bauzi."

Timothy Usher (2018) classifies it as a Lakes Plain language, closest to Awera and Rasawa–Saponi. According to Foley, based on some lexical and phonological similarities, Keuw may possibly share a deep relationship with the Lakes Plain languages. Palmer (2018) treats Keuw as a language isolate.

Phonology
Phonology of Keuw from Kamholz (2012), quoted in Foley (2018):

Consonants
Keuw has ten consonants.

Vowels
Keuw has five vowels.

Tone
Keuw has contrastive tone. Some minimal pairs demonstrating phonemic tonal contrasts:
áalìyò ‘tongue’, áalíyò ‘house’
kíilyô ‘possum’, kíilyò ‘arrow’
úukyò ‘grandfather’, úunyô ‘woman’

Syntax
Keuw has SOV word order, as exemplified by the sentence below. The morphemic suffixes remain unglossed.

Basic vocabulary
Basic vocabulary of Keuw from Kamholz (2012), quoted in Foley (2018):

{| 
|+ Keuw basic vocabulary
! gloss !! Keuw
|-
| ‘bird’ || páupǝn
|-
| ‘blood’ || kpíi
|-
| ‘bone’ || ntyéns
|-
| ‘breast’ || túulí
|-
| ‘ear’ || téemé
|-
| ‘eat’ || núu
|-
| ‘egg’ || bléemí
|-
| ‘eye’ || mlúul
|-
| ‘fire’ || núup
|-
| ‘go’ || páwì
|-
| ‘ground’ || píi
|-
| ‘hair’ || plíikd
|-
| ‘head’ || kpúunt
|-
| ‘leg’ || páud
|-
| ‘louse (body)’ || máa
|-
| ‘louse (head)’ || bréen
|-
| ‘man’ || méeli
|-
| ‘moon’ || dyúutǝn
|-
| ‘one’ || bíisìp
|-
| ‘path, road’ || ngkéempúkə
|-
| ‘see’ || líyè, tíyè, kúntáb
|-
| ‘sky’ || tpáapí
|-
| ‘stone’ || tóotí
|-
| ‘sun’ || tandən
|-
| ‘tooth’ || mée
|-
| ‘tree’ || kúd
|-
| ‘two’ || páid
|-
| ‘water’ || yél
|-
| ‘woman’ || úun
|}

The following basic vocabulary words are from the Trans-New Guinea database:

{| class="wikitable sortable"
! gloss !! Keuw
|-
| head || kpúunt-yô
|-
| ear || téemé-yô
|-
| eye || mlúul-yô
|-
| nose || klókəә̀n-yô
|-
| tooth || mée-yô
|-
| tongue || áalì-yò
|-
| pig || kómúul-yò
|-
| egg || bléemí-yò
|-
| blood || kpíi-yò
|-
| bone || ntyéns-yô
|-
| skin || mpáakəә́t-yô
|-
| breast || túulí-yò
|-
| tree || kúd-yô
|-
| sky || tpáapí-yò
|-
| sun || táadəә́n-yô
|-
| moon || dyúutəә́n-yò
|-
| water || yél-yò
|-
| fire || núup-yò; óopí-yò
|-
| stone || tóotí-yò
|-
| road, path || ŋkéempúkəә̀-yô
|-
| eat || kéep-yô; núu-nô
|-
| one || bíisìp-yò
|-
| two || páid-yô
|}

References

External links
Keuw field recordings

Endangered languages
Language isolates of New Guinea
Endangered language isolates
Wapoga languages
Tonal languages